St Johnstone Women's Football Club (formerly Jeanfield Swifts Ladies Football Club) is a Scottish women's association football club based in Perth. They are members of the Scottish Women's Premier League (SWPL), the highest level women's football league in Scotland, and have competed in its second tier, SWPL 2, since 2016.

History

Jeanfield Swifts
The club was developed as part of Jeanfield Swifts Community Football Club, a community-orientated umbrella organisation that also included the men's senior club, Jeanfield Swifts F.C., as well as amateur and youth teams. Jeanfield were promoted to SWPL2, the second tier of the Scottish Women's Premier League (SWPL) for the 2016 season. During a league match against Glasgow Girls in August of that year, the club's director of coaching Donna Shaw played alongside her 14-year-old daughter Rachel Wolecki.

St Johnstone
Following promotion to the SWPL2, the club embarked on a partnership with local senior men's club St Johnstone, allowing them to use the facilities at the latter's McDiarmid Park stadium. The two clubs announced in November 2017, under a further development of their partnership, that the Swifts first team would play under the St Johnstone name from the 2018 season onwards.

On 11 February 2018, the team played their first SWPL2 match under the St Johnstone name, losing 3–1 at home to newly promoted Central Girls.

Players

Current squad
.

References

External links

Women's football clubs in Scotland
Sport in Perth, Scotland
Scottish Women's Premier League clubs
2012 establishments in Scotland
Association football clubs established in 2012
St Johnstone F.C.
Jeanfield Swifts F.C.
Scottish Women's Football League clubs